My Mom Is a Character 3 is a 2019 Brazilian comedy film written and starred by Paulo Gustavo, based on his play of the same name. Produced by Migdal Filmes, Globo Filmes, Universal Pictures and Paramount Pictures and distributed by  Downtown Filmes, it is a sequel to the 2016 film Minha Mãe é uma Peça 2.

My Mom Is a Character 3 was theatrically released on December 26, 2019. After its release, the film received mixed to positive reviews, with some critics praising its consistent plot that differs from its prequels. The film has grossed R$181.7 million and as of May 2020, it is the highest-grossing and the second most viewed film in Brazilian film history.

Plot 
Dona Hermínia (Paulo Gustavo) will have to rediscover and reinvent herself because her children are forming new families.

The super mom will have to brace herself and deal with the changes in her life: Marcelina (Mariana Xavier) is pregnant and Juliano (Rodrigo Pandolfo) is getting married. Dona Hermínia is more anxious than ever, and, on top of that, her ex-husband  Carlos Alberto (Herson Capri), who was always around to begin with, decides to move in to the apartment next door.

Cast 

 Paulo Gustavo as Dona Herminia Amaral
 Rodrigo Pandolfo as Juliano Amaral Vieira
 Mariana Xavier as Marcelina Amaral Vieira
 Herson Capri as Carlos Alberto Vieira
 Alexandra Richter as Iesa Amaral Leite
 Patricya Travassos as Lúcia Helena Amaral
 Samantha Schmütz as Waldeia
 Malu Valle as Dona Lourdes
 Lucas Cordeiro as Tiago
 Cadu Fávero as Sol
 Stella Maria Rodrigues as Ana
 Camila Mayrink as Lizandra
 Bruno Bebianno as Garib Amaral Vieira

Reception

Critical reception 
Tony Goes from Folha de S.Paulo said “The surprise in “Minha Mãe É uma Peça 3” is precisely the plot, much more consistent than in previous projects.“

Nocolaos Garófalo from Omelete said “Although it is point to show Herminia's almost total independence from men, with the character inspired by Gustavo's mother traveling abroad, going to parties and having fun with her sister and friends, the plot undermines any reference to her independence in worn jokes about Herminia's age and how much she and Carlos Alberto have become “useless” and “crumbled” over time.”

Box office 
The film reached 1 million admissions in its opening weekend and 1.8 million admissions in the first week. After the second week, it surpassed 5 million admissions, 8 million admissions in the third week and 10 million admissions in the fourth week.

As of May 2020, with 11.5 million admissions, it is the second most watched and the highest-grossing film in the history of Brazilian cinema grossing R$181.7 million.

References 

2019 films
2019 comedy films
Brazilian comedy films
Brazilian sequel films
Films about families
Films set in Rio de Janeiro (city)
Films shot in Rio de Janeiro (city)
Paramount Pictures films
2010s Portuguese-language films
Universal Pictures films